The Roman Catholic Diocese of Goma is a diocese located in the city of Goma in the Ecclesiastical province of Bukavu in the Democratic Republic of the Congo.

History
 June 30, 1959: Established as Apostolic Vicariate of Goma from Apostolic Vicariate of Bukavu
 November 10, 1959: Promoted as Diocese of Goma

Bishops
 Bishops of Goma 
 Bishop Joseph Mikararanga Busimba (1 March 1960 – 7 September 1974)
 Bishop Faustin Ngabu (7 September 1974 – 18 March 2010)
 Bishop Théophile Kaboy Ruboneka (18 March 2010 – 23 April 2019)
 Bishop Willy Ngumbi Ngengele, M.Afr. (23 April 2019 – present)
Coadjutor bishops
 Faustin Ngabu (1974)
 Théophile Kaboy Ruboneka (2009-2010)

See also
Roman Catholicism in the Democratic Republic of the Congo

References

External links
 GCatholic.org
 Catholic Hierarchy

Roman Catholic dioceses in the Democratic Republic of the Congo
Christian organizations established in 1959
Goma
Roman Catholic dioceses and prelatures established in the 20th century
Roman Catholic Ecclesiastical Province of Bukavu